Elmwood High School is a public high school in Bloomdale.  It is the only high school in the Elmwood Local School District, which primarily serves Bloom, Montgomery, Perry, and Portage townships in Wood County, but also serves parts of Center and Freedom townships.  The towns of Bairdstown, Bloomdale, Cygnet, Jerry City, Wayne, and West Millgrove are also included in the district.

Their mascot is the Royals, generally being represented by a lion. They are currently members of the Northern Buckeye Conference after the Suburban Lakes League folded in 2011. However, the Board of Education voted to leave the Northern Buckeye Conference and enter the Blanchard Valley Conference beginning with the 2023–2024 school year.

Elmwood was created in 1957 when the school districts from Bloomdale, Cygnet, Montgomery, and Portage merged.  Bradner was part of the Montgomery district, but refused to join the merger and ultimately wound up with Lakota Local School District in 1959.

Notable alumni
 Chris Hoiles, Former MLB player (Baltimore Orioles)

References

High schools in Wood County, Ohio
Public high schools in Ohio